Córdoba Club de Fútbol, (from the 2020–21 season onwards competing under the umbrella of Unión Futbolística Cordobesa, S.A.D.) is a Spanish football club based in Córdoba, in the autonomous community of Andalusia. Founded in 1951 as Club Deportivo San Álvaro, it was refounded as Cordoba CF in 1954 after the dissolution of RCD Córdoba. Currently it plays in the Primera División RFEF – Group 1, with its home matches at the Estadio Nuevo Arcángel, which has a capacity of 25,800 seats.

History

Forerunners of Córdoba Club de Fútbol included names such as Sporting Fútbol Club de Córdoba, Sociedad Deportiva Electromecánicas and Racing Fútbol Club de Córdoba. The latter changed its name after the Spanish Civil War (as foreign names were banned under the new regime) to Club Deportivo Córdoba.

From 1940, its predecessor RCD Córdoba met varying success, spending most of its time in the second and third divisions of Spanish football. In 1944 it changed its home kit to green and white stripes, from the previous one of all white, and, the following year, Córdoba moved from Estadio America to Estadio del Arcángel. In 1954, RCD Córdoba was dissolved due to its many debts and Córdoba CF was refounded by acquiring the place of CD San Álvaro de Córdoba in the third category.

In the early 1960s and also in 1971–72, Córdoba amassed eight La Liga seasons. In its third presence it only conceded two goals at home as it went undefeated, the first being courtesy of Espanyol's Alfredo Di Stéfano. The club finished 5th, its best finish to date, but was not allowed to enter the following season's UEFA Cup due to city infrastructure issues.

In the following four decades Córdoba again fluctuated between divisions two and three, also spending 1984–85 in the fourth. After a successful 1999–2000 season in Segunda División B Córdoba was finally promoted to Segunda División.

On 17 February 2014, former Spanish international Albert Ferrer was hired as Córdoba manager. He led the team to a 7th-place finish, and then Córdoba defeated Las Palmas in the Segunda División play-off final to return to the top flight for the first time in 42 years. Ulises Dávila scored the decisive goal, a late equaliser in the away second leg, after Las Palmas fans had caused ten minutes to be added onto the game by invading the pitch.

Córdoba experienced a difficult return to La Liga however. In their opening match of the 2014–15 season, Córdoba lost 2–0 away at Real Madrid, putting them in 19th place on the table, after round 1. Following that, the team did not achieve a single win, up until the 14th round, when they managed to win 0–1 away at Athletic Bilbao. This boosted their hopes for survival in the elite. Additional wins against CF Granada at home and Rayo Vallecano away in rounds 17 and 18 put the team in 14th place. However, ten straight defeats from rounds 20-29 again put the Andalusians in last place. The team did not improve, remaining in last place until the end of the season. They only collected two points from their last 18 games, thus losing all hopes for survival. At the end of the season, Córdoba only collected 20 points, 15 points behind Granada CF, which avoided relegation. Their relegation was confirmed with three games remaining after a 0–8 home defeat against FC Barcelona.

On 15 June 2018, the club announced that it had purchased local women's club AD El Naranjo and their respective youth teams with the intention of turning them into the club's official women's team. The newly created Córdoba Club de Fútbol Femenino will play in the Spanish Segunda División (women) starting in the 2018–19 season. After ranking second-to-last in the 2018–19 Segunda División (after disqualified Reus), the club was demoted to Segunda B.

In December 2019, the club was purchased by Infinity, an investment fund from Bahrain, for a reported amount of €3.25 million The club gained promotion to the Primera RFEF (third tier of the Spanish league system) in April 2022.

Stadium

Córdoba currently plays at the Estadio Nuevo Arcángel, opened in 1993. Since 2004 the stadium has been going through a remodelling, converting it to a pure football stadium. Three of the four sides have been rebuilt. When the fourth stand is rebuilt the capacity will be 25,100 seats.

Season to season
As CD San Álvaro

As Córdoba CF

9 seasons in La Liga
31 seasons in Segunda División
1 season in Primera Federación
22 seasons in Segunda División B
1 season in Segunda Federación
4 seasons in Tercera División

Honours
 Segunda División
 Winners (1): 1961–62

 Segunda División B
 Winners (2): 1994–95, 1996–97 

 Tercera División
 Winners (1): 1955–56 

 Copa Federación de España
 Winners (1): 2021

Notes

Current squad
.

Reserve team

Out on loan

Retired numbers

8  Juanín (deceased) (1960–70)

Current technical staff

Former players
See 

 Vicente del Bosque
 Florin Andone
 José Antonio Reyes
 Daniel Onega
 Juanin
 Miguel Reina
 Paco Jémez
 Rafael Berges
 Toni Muñoz
 Javi Moreno
 Roque Olsen
 Oleg Salenko
 Fernando Cáceres
 Miguel de las Cuevas
 Federico Piovaccari
 Javi Flores
 Rene Krhin
 Fidel Escobar
 Nicolás Olivera
 Ariel Montenegro
 Alejandro Alfaro
 Paweł Kieszek
 Lauren
 Cristian Osvaldo Álvarez
 Juan Luna Eslava
 Jaime Romero
 Robert Fernández
 Jesús García Sanjuán
 Silvio González
 Charles Dias de Oliveira
 Bebé
 Fede Vico
 Xisco Jiménez
 Alessandro Pierini
 Rafa Navarro
 Borja García
 Javier Patiño

Former coaches

 José Juncosa (1955–57)
 Roque Olsen (1959–63)
 Rosendo Hernández (1963–64)
 Ignacio Eizaguirre (1964–65)
 Eduardo Toba (1965–66)
 Marcel Domingo (1966–68)
   László Kubala (1968–69)
 Ignacio Eizaguirre (1969–70)
 José Juncosa (1970–71)
 Vavá (1971–72)
 Joseíto (1972–73)
 Vavá (1974–75)
 Ignacio Eizaguirre (1975–77)
 Pachín (1981)
 Cayetano Ré (1981–82)
 Zdravko Rajkov (1981–83)
 Manuel Ruiz Sosa (1983–84)
 Josu Ortuondo (1985–86)
 Vicente Carlos Campillo (1987–88)
 Francisco Parreño (1991–92)
 Julio Cardeñosa (1991–92)
 Luis Costa (1993)
 Sánchez Duque (2001)
 José Murcia (2001–02)
 Mariano García Remón (2002)
 Josu Ortuondo (2002–03)
 Fernando Zambrano (2003)
 Fernando Castro Santos (2003)
 Miguel Ángel Portugal (2003–04)
 Roberto (2004)
 Esteban Vigo (2004)
 Quique Hernández (1 July 2005 – 1 Oct 2005)
 Paco Jémez (1 July 2007 – 30 May 2008)
 José González (2008)
 Juan Luna Eslava (9 Dec 2008 – 30 June 2009)
 Lucas Alcaraz (1 July 2009 – 30 June 2011)
 Paco Jémez (1 July 2011 – 13 June 2012)
 Rafael Berges (1 July 2012 – 8 April 2013)
 Juan Esnáider (13 April 2013 – 30 June 2013)
 Pablo Villa (1 July 2013 – 9 Feb 2014)
 Luis Carrión (interim) (9 Feb 2014 – 16 Feb 2014)
 Albert Ferrer (17 Feb 2014 – 20 Oct 2014)
 Miroslav Đukić (20 Oct 2014 – 16 March 2015)
 José Antonio Romero (interim) (2015)
 José Luis Oltra (2015–16)

References

External links

Official website 
Futbolme team profile 
BDFutbol team profile

 
Football clubs in Andalusia
Association football clubs established in 1951
1951 establishments in Spain
Sport in Córdoba, Spain
Segunda División clubs
La Liga clubs
Primera Federación clubs